Carleton Village is a  community in the Canadian province of Nova Scotia, located in the Shelburne municipal district of Shelburne County. 
The community is named after Sir Guy Carleton.

See also
 List of communities in Nova Scotia

References

External links
Carleton Village on Destination Nova Scotia

Communities in Shelburne County, Nova Scotia
General Service Areas in Nova Scotia
Populated coastal places in Canada